The 2012 Atlanta Falcons season was the franchise's 47th season in the National Football League and the fifth under head coach Mike Smith. Atlanta started the season 8–0, a franchise best for a start to a season. By beating the Detroit Lions during Week 16, the Falcons clinched homefield advantage throughout the playoffs in the NFC for the second time in three years, and made it to the NFC Championship for the first time since 2004, where they lost 28–24 against the San Francisco 49ers. It was the third straight year in which they didn't lose two consecutive regular season games.

2012 draft class

The Falcons did not have a first- or fourth-round selection.

Notes
  The team traded its first and fourth-round selections, as well as its first-, second-, and fourth-round selections in 2011 to the Cleveland Browns in exchange for Cleveland's first round selection in 2011, used to select wide receiver Julio Jones.
  The team traded its original seventh-round selection (#229 overall) to the Philadelphia Eagles in exchange for cornerback Asante Samuel.

Staff

Final roster

Schedule

Preseason

Regular season

Game summaries

Regular season

Week 1: at Kansas City Chiefs

The Falcons started their season on the road against the Chiefs. They would get on the board first with Matt Ryan's 8-yard touchdown pass to Julio Jones for a 7–0 lead. The Chiefs later got on the board with a 39-yard field goal from Ryan Succop to trim the lead to 7–3. However, the Falcons pushed the lead back to 7 as Matt Bryant would hit a 34-yard field goal to move the Falcons up 10–3. In the 2nd quarter, the Chiefs managed to tie it with Matt Cassel's 22-yard touchdown pass to Kevin Boss to tie the game at 10–10. However, the Falcons retook the lead as Matt Ryan found Julio Jones again for a 14-yard passing touchdown to make the score 17–10. The Chiefs then tied it up with Matt Cassel's 5-yard touchdown run for a score of 17–17, but the Falcons retook the lead again with Matt Bryant kicking a 21-yard field goal for a 20–17 halftime lead. After the break, the Falcons got right back to work as they increased their lead in the third quarter with Matt Ryan's 5-yard touchdown run to move ahead 27–17 then a 7-yard pass from the QB to Tony Gonzalez for a 34–17 lead. Later, 2 field goals from Matt Bryant from 30 and 41 yards out for leads of 37–17 and then 40–17, and basically sealed it. The Chiefs tried to rally a comeback but were only limited to scoring 7 points off of Shaun Draughn's 4-yard touchdown run for a final score of 40–24.

With the win, the Falcons started their season 1–0.

Week 2: vs. Denver Broncos

After winning over the Chiefs on the road, the Falcons returned home to face a newly formed Peyton Manning-led Broncos team. The Falcons got off to a really fast start scoring 20 unanswered points in the first half thanks to four Broncos turnovers. Three plays into the game, Peyton Manning on 3rd-and-12 from his own 12, was intercepted by William Moore at the 34. He returned it 33 yards to the 1 yard line. Three plays later, Michael Turner's 1-yard touchdown run gave the Falcons a 7–0 lead Another interception by Manning led to Matt Bryant's 37-yard field goal to take a 10–0 lead. In the 2nd quarter, the team moved up 13–0 after a Willis McGahee fumble which led to Bryant's 42-yard field goal then Ryan's 1-yard touchdown pass to Tony Gonzalez for a 20–0 lead. The Broncos scored before halftime with Peyton Manning's 17-yard touchdown pass to Demaryius Thomas to cut the lead to 20–7 at halftime. In the third quarter, the Falcons moved ahead by 20 again with Matt Ryan's 4-yard touchdown pass Roddy White for a 27–7 lead. The Broncos then tried to rally a comeback in the 4th quarter with Willis McGahee running for 2-yard touchdowns to cut the lead to 27–21, but the Falcons were able to hold the Broncos off and win the game.

With the win, the Falcons improved to 2–0.

Week 3: at San Diego Chargers

The Falcons traveled to take on their 3rd-straight AFC Opponent, the Chargers at Qualcomm Stadium. Again, the Falcons get off to a great start scoring 20 unanswered points for the 2nd straight week. The fast scoring started with Matt Ryan's 8-yard touchdown pass to Jacquizz Rodgers (with a failed 2-point conversion) for a 6–0 lead in the first quarter, followed up in the second quarter with a 7-yard pass to Tony Gonzalez for a 13–0 lead and finally a 9-yard pass to Julio Jones for a 20–0 halftime lead. The Chargers got their only points of the game as Nate Kaeding scored a field goal from 41 yards out, but the Falcons scored the final points in the fourth quarter on a Michael Turner 7-yard touchdown run to make the final score 27–3.

With the win, the Falcons improved to 3–0.

Week 4: vs. Carolina Panthers

The Falcons traveled back home to take on their division rival Panthers whom they have won 4 straight games over. However, for the first time in the 2012 season, the Falcons trailed a game in the first quarter with Cam Newton's 18-yard touchdown pass to Greg Olson for a 7–0 lead. The Falcons however, were able to move down the field and tie the game
with Matt Ryan's 49-yard touchdown pass to Roddy White. The Falcons moved into the lead in the second quarter with Matt Bryant's 41-yard field goal. However, the Panthers retook the lead as DeAngelo Williams ran a touchdown from 13 yards out to make the score 14–10. However, the Falcons then moved back into the lead before halftime with Ryan finding White on a 14-yard touchdown pass to make the score 17–14 at halftime. In the third quarter, the Falcons moved ahead by 10 with Ryan finding Michael Turner on a 60-yard touchdown pass for a 24–14 lead. However, The Panthers were not done yet as they scored 14 unanswered points with Cam Newton's 4-yard run for the last score of the 3rd quarter cutting the lead to 3 at, 24–21. Then, in the fourth quarter Newton found Kealoha Pilares on a 38-yard pass to take a 28–24 lead. The Falcons rallied coming within a point as Matt Bryant scored a field goal from 33 yards out cutting the lead to 28–27. With the ball one last time, the Falcons' comeback drive was successful as they moved down the field and Bryant drained the game-winning field goal from 40 yards out to win the game 30–28.

With their 5th straight win over the Panthers, the Falcons improved to 4–0 for only the 3rd time in franchise history.

Week 5: at Washington Redskins

After a tough win at home, the Falcons traveled to take on the Redskins. After a scoreless first quarter, the Falcons would trail a game again for the second time all season as the Skins took the lead with Ryan Kerrigan returning an interception 28 yards for a touchdown. The Falcons offense sputtered for the majority of the half, but not long before halftime, Matt Ryan was able to find Tony Gonzalez on a 1-yard pass to tie the game. In the third quarter, the Skins retook the lead with Billy Cundiff scoring a 23-yard field goal to make the score 10–7 for the only score of the period. But then crazy fourth quarter scoring began as the Falcons retook the lead as Matt Ryan found Julio Jones on an 18-yard touchdown pass to make the score 14–10. The Skins however moved back into the lead as their 2nd-string and fellow rookie QB Kirk Cousins found Santana moss on a 77-yard pass. Matt Bryant's 53-yard field goal would tie the game at 17. Michael Turner's 13-yard touchdown run would then secure the 24–17 victory for the Falcons.

With the win, the Falcons started 5–0 for the first time in franchise history.

Week 6: vs. Oakland Raiders

The Falcons returned home to take on the last of their AFC Opponents. Coming back home they are 3–0 against the AFC West. However, for the 3rd straight week, the team would trail a game as the Raiders moved ahead after Sebastian Janikowski's 53-yard field goal for the only score of the first quarter. The Falcons however took the lead with Matt Ryan finding Roddy White on a 4-yard pass to move up 7–3. However, the Raiders would come within a point with Janikowski kicking a 22-yard field goal and then retook the lead with Carson Palmer's 25-yard touchdown pass to Denarius Moore for a 13–7 halftime lead. After the break, the Falcons were able to score 13 unanswered points. First, Bryant kicked 2 field goals from 41 and 20 yards tie the game at 13–13. Then, In the fourth quarter, they took the lead after Asante Samuel returned an interception from 79 yards out for a touchdown to make the score 20–13. The Raiders however were able to make up for this mistake as Carson Palmer drove them down the field and Darren McFadden ran a touchdown in from 2 yards out to tie the game at 20–20. However, again the Falcons were able to complete the comeback as Bryant nailed a 55-yard field goal with 0:01 left to make the final score 23–20

With the win, the Falcons go into their bye week with their first ever 6–0 start to a season. They also finish the season 4–0 against the AFC West and with the Texans' loss to the Packers on Sunday Night, they remain the NFL's only undefeated team.

Week 8: at Philadelphia Eagles

The Falcons traveled to the wake of Philadelphia to take on the Eagles. The game, played under cloudy skies, was also notable in that the weather conditions heralded the approach of Hurricane Sandy, a storm which was set to make landfall in nearby South Jersey.

In the first quarter, the Falcons drew first blood as Matt Ryan found Drew Davis for a 15-yard pass to make the score 7–0. The team increased their lead with Ryan finding Jason Snelling to make it 14–0. In the 2nd quarter, the Eagles would get on the board with LeSean McCoy's 2-Yard run. However, the Falcons responded with Ryan's 63-yard TD pass to Julio Jones and with Matt Bryant's 43-yard field goal to make it 24–7. The Eagles would try to rally in the 3rd quarter with a 33-yard field goal from Alex Henry to shorten the lead to 24–10, but the Falcons pulled away as Bryant would kick a 29-yard field and later in the 4th quarter, Bryant increased the Falcons' lead with a 30-yard field goal to make the score 30–10. The Eagles tried to rally as Michael Vick found McCoy to make the score 30–17, but couldn't do anything when they got the ball back, making the final score, 30–17.

With the win, the Falcons improved to 7–0 for the first time in franchise history. The team also moves to 2–0 against the NFC East.

Week 9: vs. Dallas Cowboys

The Falcons returned home to take on the Cowboys. The Cowboys drew first blood with their 23-yard field goal from Dan Bailey to take a 3–0 lead. With this field goal, the Falcons' trend then simmered to 4 out of their last 5 games trailing a team. The Cowboys then put up another Bailey field goal from 32 yards out to make the lead 6–0. The Falcons responded in the second quarter with field goals from Matt Bryant from 45 and 46 yards out to tie the game at halftime at 6–6. After a scoreless third quarter, the Falcons took the lead in the fourth quarter with Michael Turner running for a 3-yard touchdown. Then they increased their lead with Bryant's 36-yard field goal for a 16–6 lead. The Boys tried to rally as Tony Romo found Kevin Ogletree on a 21-yard touchdown pass to cut the lead to 16–13, but the Falcons increased their lead with Bryant's 32-yard field goal, making the Cowboys have to score a touchdown. They couldn't and the Falcons won 19–13.

With the win, the Falcons improved to 8–0 for the first time in franchise history. Also they went 3–0 against the NFC East.

Week 10: at New Orleans Saints

The Falcons traveled to New Orleans to take on their longtime rival Saints. They drew first blood as Mike Johnson got a 1-yard touchdown pass from Matt Ryan to take a 7–0 lead. They then increased their lead to make the score 10–0 off of a Matt Bryant field goal from 37 yards out. The Saints got on the board as Chris Ivory ran for a 56-yard touchdown to make the score 10–7. In the 2nd quarter, the Saints took the lead as Drew Brees found Jimmy Graham for a 29-yard pass to make the score 14–10. Then the Falcons retook the lead as Tony Gonzalez caught a 6-yard pass from Matt Ryan to move ahead 17–14. The Saints moved back into the lead as Brees found Graham again on a 14-yard pass for a 21–17 halftime lead. After the break, the Saints went back to work as Brees found Marques Colston on a 7-yard pass to move ahead 28–17. The Falcons drew within 4 points with Gonzalez's 6-yard pass from Ryan to make the score 28–24 for the only score of the 3rd quarter and then Bryant kicked another field goal to make the score 20-yard field goal for a 28–27. However, the offense was then overpowered as the Saints scored their only points of the half off of Garrett Hartley's 31-yard field goal to make the final score 31–27.

With the loss, the Falcons dropped to 8–1.

Tony Gonzalez became the first tight end in NFL history to have 100 receiving touchdowns.

Week 11: vs. Arizona Cardinals

With the close win, the Falcons improved to 9–1 giving them their 5th straight winning season.

Week 12: at Tampa Bay Buccaneers

With the win, the Falcons improved to 10–1.

Week 13: vs. New Orleans Saints

With the win, the Falcons not only improved to 11–1, but also clinched the division title of the NFC South, following the Bucs' loss to the Broncos that week. Additionally, the Falcons broke Drew Brees' 54-game touchdown streak.

Week 14: at Carolina Panthers

Week 15: vs. New York Giants

The 34–0 win over the Giants was the worst shutout loss to a defending Super Bowl champion team in NFL history. The next three worst were 27–0, 17–0, and 16–0, all by the Oakland Raiders in the same season.

Week 16: at Detroit Lions

With their victory in the Motor City on Saturday night, Atlanta improved to 13–2 and clinched the No. 1 playoff seed in the NFC (and as a result home-field advantage) for the first time since 2010.

Calvin Johnson broke Jerry Rice's record for Most Receiving Yards in a Season. Rice had 1,848 in his 1995 season and Johnson now had 1,892 with one game left to play.

Week 17: vs. Tampa Bay Buccaneers

During the game, John Abraham suffered an ankle injury. Also, Asante Samuel appeared to have aggravated a shoulder injury and Dunta Robinson suffered a head injury.

Postseason

NFC Divisional Playoffs: vs. #5 Seattle Seahawks

The Falcons lost a 20-point lead in the fourth quarter, but won on Matt Bryant's 49-yard field goal, snapping the Falcons' postseason losing streak starting in the 2004 NFC Championship Game. The Seahawks attempted a final Hail Mary pass, but Russell Wilson's pass was intercepted by Julio Jones in the end zone, sending Atlanta to the NFC Championship Game. This game was ranked #2 on NFL.com's 20 Best Games of 2012 as Gamers.

NFC Championship: vs. #2 San Francisco 49ers

With the loss, the Falcons finished their season 14–4. The Falcons lead the 49ers 24–14 at the half, but the 49ers responded with 14 unanswered points in the second half. This would be their final playoff appearance until their Super Bowl appearing 2016 season.

Standings

References

External links
 
 2012 Atlanta Falcons at Pro Football Reference
 2012 Atlanta Falcons at ESPN

Atlanta
Atlanta Falcons seasons
NFC South championship seasons
Atlanta Falcons